Piszkawa  is a village in the administrative district of Gmina Oleśnica, within Oleśnica County, Lower Silesian Voivodeship, in south-western Poland. Prior to 1945, it located was in Germany.

References

Piszkawa